Oleg Yuryevich Mityaev (born 1974-death 15 March 2022) is a Russian major-general who according to Ukrainian officials was killed during the 2022 Russian invasion of Ukraine on 15 March 2022. His death, however, has not been confirmed.

Biography 
From 2013 to 2015 Mityaev was commander of the 11th Guards Air Assault Brigade. Between December 2016 and November 2018 he ran the Russian 201st Military Base in Tajikistan. He was one of the leaders of the Russian intervention in Syria. From 2020 Mityaev was the commander of Russia's 150th Motorised Rifle Division.

According to Ukrainian officials, he was killed in a Ukrainian ambush while taking part in a "combat mission" (according to Russian reports) during the Siege of Mariupol at the Illich Steel and Iron Works during the 2022 Russian invasion of Ukraine, reportedly by the Azov Battalion. According to the Ukrainians, he was the fourth Russian general killed during the 2022 invasion. Western sources believe 20 major-generals were deployed to Ukraine.

See also 
 List of Russian generals killed during the 2022 invasion of Ukraine

References 

1974 births
People from Orenburg
Russian major generals
Recipients of the Order of Courage
Recipients of the Medal of the Order "For Merit to the Fatherland" I class
Recipients of the Medal of the Order "For Merit to the Fatherland" II class
Recipients of the Medal of Zhukov
Siege of Mariupol

Possibly living people